Texas Review Press is a university press affiliated with Sam Houston State University, located in Huntsville, Texas. The press, which was founded in 1979, publishes the Texas Review (a periodical specializing in poetry, fiction, and creative nonfiction), as well as various scholarly books and monographs.

The Texas Review Press is a part of Sam Houston State University's College of Humanities and Social Sciences, and it releases around 20 books annually. Texas Review Press participates in Texas A&M University Press's Texas Book Consortium program. The press is also a member of the Association of University Presses and the Community of Literary Magazines and Presses (CLMP).

History 
The press can trace its origins back to 1976, when Sam Houston State University English professor Paul Ruffin helped establish the Sam Houston Literary Review, a biannual academic journal article that focused on poetry and fiction. The journal began to sell fiction and poetry pieces, and by 1979, Ruffin's creation had earned enough money for him to found the Texas Review Press. The press later joined the Texas Book Consortium program in 1997.

Publications

Book series
Notable book series published by Texas Review Press include:
 "Con[text]ual"
 "Innovative Prose"
 "The Sabine Series in Literature"
 "The Margaret Lea Houston Series"
 "The TRP Chapbook Series"
 "The TRP Southern Poetry Breakthrough Series"
 "The Signature Series"

Journals
Journals published by the Texas Review Press include:
 Texas Review

See also

 List of English-language book publishing companies
 List of university presses

References

External links 
Texas Review Press

Sam Houston State University Press
Texas